Stanya is a rural locality (a settlement) in Karaulinsky Selsoviet, Kamyzyaksky District, Astrakhan Oblast, Russia. The population was 219 as of 2010. There are 3 streets.

Geography 
Stanya is located 38 km south of Kamyzyak (the district's administrative centre) by road. Kirovsky is the nearest rural locality.

References 

Rural localities in Kamyzyaksky District